The 46th Massachusetts General Court, consisting of the Massachusetts Senate and the Massachusetts House of Representatives, met in 1825 and 1826 during the governorship of Levi Lincoln Jr. Nathaniel Silsbee served as president of the Senate and Timothy Fuller served as speaker of the House.

Senators

Representatives

See also
 19th United States Congress
 List of Massachusetts General Courts

References

External links
 
 
 
 

Political history of Massachusetts
Massachusetts legislative sessions
massachusetts
1825 in Massachusetts
massachusetts
1826 in Massachusetts